John Bonet  (fl. 1385–1399) of Ockley, Surrey, was an English politician.

He was a Member (MP) of the Parliament of England for Guildford in 1385, February 1388, January 1397 and 1399 and for Surrey in April 1414 and May 1421.

References

Year of birth missing
Year of death missing
English MPs 1385
English MPs February 1388
English MPs January 1397
English MPs 1399
English MPs April 1414
English MPs May 1421
Members of the Parliament of England for Surrey
Members of the Parliament of England for Guildford